Sphenomorphus fuscolineatus  is a species of skink found in Papua New Guinea.

References

fuscolineatus
Reptiles described in 2004
Taxa named by Allen Eddy Greer
Taxa named by Glenn Michael Shea
Skinks of New Guinea